Heather is an unincorporated community in Marion County, in the U.S. state of Missouri.

History
A post office called Heather was established in 1901, and remained in operation until 1906. The community has the name of H. Clay Heather, a state legislator.

References

Unincorporated communities in Marion County, Missouri
Unincorporated communities in Missouri